Leslie Tomkins (born 1948) is an English art director. He was nominated for an Academy Award in the category Best Art Direction for the film Yentl.

Selected filmography
 Yentl (1983)

References

External links
 

1948 births
Living people
English art directors